Ostertag is a German surname that may refer to the following people:

Blanche Ostertag (1872–1915), American decorative artist
Bob Ostertag (born 1957), American experimental sound artist, political activist and writer
Greg Ostertag (born 1973), American basketball player
Harold C. Ostertag (1896–1985), American politician
Heiger Ostertag (born 1953), German novelist
Molly Knox Ostertag (born 1991), American cartoonist and writer
Robert von Ostertag (1864–1940), German veterinarian 
Sébastien Ostertag (born 1979), French team handball player

German-language surnames
Surnames from nicknames